Olé Olé may refer to:

Olé Olé (band), a Spanish pop music group in the 1980s 
Olé Olé (Olé Olé album), 1983
Olé, Olé (Rachid Taha album), 1995
Olé Olé, a 1978 album and song by Charo
Olé, Olé (song), a song by Izhar Cohen, Israeli entry in the Eurovision Song Contest 1985
"Ole Ole", a Hindi song from the film Yeh Dillagi 1994
"Olé Olé", a song by German rapper Mero, 2019

See also
"Ajax, Olé Olé Olé", a 1969 song by Willy Alberti sung with the Supporters of the Dutch association football club AFC Ajax
Olé, Olé, Olé, football chant
"Top of the World (Olé, Olé, Olé)", single by Chumbawamba 1998
"Loving You (Ole Ole Ole)", a song by Brian Harvey